Teun Floris de Nooijer (born 22 March 1976) is a field hockey player from the Netherlands, who twice became Olympic champion with the Dutch national squad, in 1996 and in 2000, and was on the team in 2012. He currently plays for Dutch side HC Bloemendaal and in Hockey India League for Uttar Pradesh Wizards.

Career

Dutch Hockey Sides (1994-Present)
Born in Egmond aan den Hoef, he made his debut on 4 June 1994 in a friendly match against New Zealand. Since then the midfielder played over three hundred international matches for the Dutch. On April 4, 2007 he earned his 350th cap for the Netherlands national field hockey team, when the team defeated Belgium (7-3) in a friendly in Boxtel, North Brabant.

De Nooijer started playing hockey at the age of nine, with his brothers in the backyard of their house. He joined HC Alkmaar at the age of eleven, and was selected for the Dutch under-16 team 2 years later. At fifteen, De Nooijer made his debut in the senior men's league with HC Alkmaar, and two years later, he first played in the Netherlands' elite league with HC Bloemendaal. After two seasons wearing the number 11 shirt, De Nooijer switched to the number 14, made famous by Johan Cruijff, and has worn it for club and country ever since. The number was later bestowed on the signature stick he helped to create, the Dita Giga #14

De Nooijer played for Alkmaar before moving to HC Bloemendaal. After the 1998 Hockey World Cup he played for a couple of months in Germany, at Harvestehuder THC. In the final of the 1998 Hockey World Cup in Utrecht he scored the golden goal in the final against Spain. De Nooijer was named World Hockey Player of the Year in 2003, 2005 and 2006 by the International Hockey Federation (FIH). De Nooijer created history when he won the award, which was presented by Jacques Rogge for a record third time. Jamie Dwyer, however, equaled this record when he won the award for the third time in 2009, and surpassed it when he won the award again in 2010. The only other man to have won the award more than once is de Nooijer’s former team mate Stephan Veen (1998, 2000).

Earlier in 2006, de Nooijer was the decisive factor in the Champions Trophy final as the Netherlands claimed a record-equalling eighth crown and de Nooijer's sixth.

He claimed his 400th cap for the Netherlands on 15 August 2009 against the 5-3 victory against India

Uttar Pradesh Wizards (2012-Present)
De Nooijer become the Highest Paid Player for Hockey India League, When he was signed by UP Wizards. Since then he was playing for them.

Personal life
De Nooijer is married to Philippa Suxdorf, herself a former German international hockey player with 154 caps under her belt. They have 3 daughters, seven-year-old Philine, five-year-old Lilly, and two-year-old Nana.

Coaching career
He currently is the coach of the women's team of HC Bloemendaal.

References

External links

 Dutch Hockey Federation

1976 births
Living people
People from Egmond
Dutch male field hockey players
Male field hockey midfielders
Dutch field hockey coaches
Olympic field hockey players of the Netherlands
Olympic gold medalists for the Netherlands
Olympic silver medalists for the Netherlands
Field hockey players at the 1996 Summer Olympics
1998 Men's Hockey World Cup players
Field hockey players at the 2000 Summer Olympics
2002 Men's Hockey World Cup players
Field hockey players at the 2004 Summer Olympics
2006 Men's Hockey World Cup players
Field hockey players at the 2008 Summer Olympics
2010 Men's Hockey World Cup players
Olympic medalists in field hockey
Field hockey players at the 2012 Summer Olympics
Medalists at the 2012 Summer Olympics
Medalists at the 2004 Summer Olympics
Medalists at the 2000 Summer Olympics
Medalists at the 1996 Summer Olympics
HC Bloemendaal players
Harvestehuder THC players
Uttar Pradesh Wizards players
Hockey India League players
Sportspeople from North Holland
Dutch expatriate sportspeople in India
Expatriate field hockey players
21st-century Dutch people